Elections to Banbridge District Council were held on 18 May 1977 on the same day as the other Northern Irish local government elections. The election used two district electoral areas to elect a total of 15 councillors.

Election results

Note: "Votes" are the first preference votes.

Districts summary

|- class="unsortable" align="centre"
!rowspan=2 align="left"|Ward
! % 
!Cllrs
! % 
!Cllrs
! %
!Cllrs
! %
!Cllrs
!rowspan=2|TotalCllrs
|- class="unsortable" align="center"
!colspan=2 bgcolor="" | UUP
!colspan=2 bgcolor="" | DUP
!colspan=2 bgcolor="" | SDLP
!colspan=2 bgcolor="white"| Others
|-
|align="left"|Area A
|bgcolor="40BFF5"|36.2
|bgcolor="40BFF5"|3
|17.8
|2
|12.2
|1
|33.8
|2
|7
|-
|align="left"|Area B
|bgcolor="40BFF5"|57.9
|bgcolor="40BFF5"|5
|16.8
|2
|17.8
|1
|7.5
|0
|8
|- class="unsortable" class="sortbottom" style="background:#C9C9C9"
|align="left"| Total
|47.0
|8
|17.3
|3
|15.0
|2
|20.7
|2
|15
|-
|}

Districts results

Area A

1973: 4 x UUP, 2 x Independent Nationalist, 1 x Independent Unionist
1977: 3 x UUP, 1 x DUP, 1 x SDLP, 1 x Independent Nationalist, 1 x Independent Unionist
1973-1977 Change: DUP and SDLP gain from UUP and Independent Nationalist

Area B

1973: 7 x UUP, 1 x SDLP
1977: 5 x UUP, 2 x DUP, 1 x SDLP
1973-1977 Change: DUP (two seats) gain from UUP (two seats)

References

Banbridge District Council elections
Banbridge